The 2017–18 Moldovan Women Top League season in association football was the 18th since its establishment. The season began on 3 September 2017 and ended on 17 June 2018. Noroc Nimoreni were the defending champions.

Teams

Format
The schedule consists of two rounds, each team plays each other once home-and-away for a total of 16 matches per team.

League table

Results

References

External links
Women Top League - Moldova - Results, fixtures, tables - FMF 

Moldovan Women Top League 2017-18
Moldovan Women Top League seasons
Moldova